Chhim Siek Leng (born 12 April 1940) is a Cambodian politician. He belongs to the Funcinpec party and was elected to represent Kampong Cham in the National Assembly of Cambodia in 2003. Leng was a close ally of then-party president Prince Norodom Ranariddh. In 2008, he was appointed as the President of the Norodom Ranariddh Party.

References

1940 births 
FUNCINPEC politicians
Living people
Members of the National Assembly (Cambodia)
Members of the Senate (Cambodia) 
Government ministers of Cambodia 
Norodom Ranariddh Party politicians
Governors of Phnom Penh